"Tiny Dancer" is a song written by English musician Elton John and songwriter Bernie Taupin, and performed by John. It was originally released on John's 1971 album Madman Across the Water, and was later released as a single in 1972. It was ranked No. 47 on the 2021 list of Rolling Stone's 500 Greatest Songs of All Time.

In the United States, it was certified gold on 19 May 2005, platinum on 19 August 2011 and 3× platinum on 26 April 2018 by the Recording Industry Association of America. In the UK, "Tiny Dancer" was certified gold on 17 August 2018 by the British Phonographic Industry (BPI) for sales of 400,000 copies. On 2 August 2019 it was certified platinum for sales of 600,000 and on 24 December 2021 it was certified 2× Platinum for sales of 1,200,000, despite never being released as an official single there.

Background and writing
With lyrics written by Bernie Taupin, the song was first featured as the opening track to John's 1971 album, Madman Across the Water. The song's lyrics were inspired by Taupin's first visit to the US in 1970, and were intended to capture the spirit of California, where he found the women he met highly contrasted with those who he had known in his home country of England. Taupin also stated in a 1973 interview in Rolling Stone that the song is about Maxine Feibelman, his wife at the time. In 2019, Feibelman said, "I knew [the song] was about me.  I had been into ballet as a little girl and sewed patches on Elton's jackets and jeans", referring to the song's description of a "seamstress for the band".

History
The song features piano-based accompaniment during verses. The arrangement start features pedal steel guitar played by English guitarist BJ Cole, light percussion, Paul Buckmaster's strings and a quiet choir. Back-up vocals are provided by Tony Burrows, among others.

Due to the song's lengthy run time of 6:12 minutes, "Tiny Dancer" was initially a non-starter as a single in the US, reaching only No. 41 on the U.S. pop chart, and was not even released as a single in the UK. Some radio edits ended the song following the first chorus, because the first verse repeats.  Some radio stations banned the song, due to the controversial opening lines of the second verse: "Jesus Freaks/ Out in the Streets". The song fared better in Canada, where John had much of his early commercial breakthrough success, peaking at #19.  It was also a hit in Australia, peaking at #13.  Eventually, the song slowly became one of John's most popular songs even in the territories that initially failed to embrace it, and the full-length version is now a fixture on North American, UK and Australian adult contemporary and rock radio stations. The song also received a boost of popularity after being prominently featured in the 2000 film Almost Famous. The song was also featured in the 1975 film Aloha, Bobby and Rose.

In 1971, Elton John performed the song on the first series of The Old Grey Whistle Test. The performance has been released as part of The Old Grey Whistle Test – Volumes 1–3 Box Set.

In 2010, Rolling Stone ranked the song number 397 on their list of the 500 Greatest Songs of All Time.

Live performances
Since 1971, John regularly performed this song alongside "Levon" on his concert tours in various decades.

An orchestral live version of the song was performed by John with the Melbourne Symphony Orchestra on 14 December 1986 at the Sydney Entertainment Centre during the final concert of his 1986 Tour De Force tour in Australia and that performance was included on his 1987 live album Live in Australia with the Melbourne Symphony Orchestra.

Music video
In May 2017, an official music video for "Tiny Dancer" premiered at the Cannes Film Festival as a winner of Elton John: The Cut, a competition organised in partnership with AKQA, Pulse Films, and YouTube in honour of the fiftieth anniversary of his songwriting relationship with Bernie Taupin. The competition called upon independent filmmakers to submit treatments for music videos for one of three Elton John songs from the 1970s, with each song falling within a specific concept category. "Tiny Dancer" was designated for the live-action category, with the competition won by Max Weiland. The video was filmed in Los Angeles, and features scenes of various residents driving around the city, including performer Marilyn Manson and Iris Karina.

Charts

Certifications

Personnel 

 Elton John – acoustic piano, vocals
 Caleb Quaye – electric guitar 
 B. J. Cole – pedal steel guitar
 Davey Johnstone – acoustic guitar
 David Glover – bass guitar
 Roger Pope – drums
 Paul Buckmaster – orchestral arrangements and conductor
 David Katz – orchestra contractor
 Tony Burrows – backing vocals 
 Nigel Olsson – backing vocals
 Roger Cook – backing vocals
 Dee Murray – backing vocals
 Lesley Duncan – backing vocals
 Barry St. John – backing vocals 
 Terry Steele – backing vocals
 Liza Strike – backing vocals
 Sue and Sunny – backing vocals

Covers
In 2009, DJ Ironik and Chipmunk created a remix of the song, featuring John singing the chorus, which peaked at No.3 in the UK Singles Chart.

In 1990, John Frusciante of the Red Hot Chili Peppers performed his first impromptu performance of the song for the audience of Pinkpop that year. He has since performed the song at least fifty times during Red hot Chili Peppers shows. 

A version featuring Mary Black, Paddy Casey and Declan O'Rourke was recorded in Galway, Ireland in 2012 as a charity single. This version reached number one on the Irish Singles Chart.

In season 3 episode 1 of Friends "The One with the Princess Leia Fantasy", when discussing the most romantic songs, Lisa Kudrow's character Phoebe says that her favourite, the song Tiny Dancer, was in fact written for Tony Danza which she tries to prove by singing the line "Hold me close, young Tony Danza". After a Friends: The Reunion episode, Courteney Cox invited Elton John, Ed Sheeran and Brandi Carlile to pay a short tribute to Lisa's character once famously misquoting the song.

Tim McGraw covered the song for his 2002 album Tim McGraw and the Dancehall Doctors.

In 2022, it was reported that John was teaming with Britney Spears in a remake of "Tiny Dancer". Later on, John announced a song titled "Hold Me Closer", with Spears also confirming her involvement in the track. The song was released on 26 August 2022, though it leaked online a week ahead. "Hold Me Closer" is a duet between John and Spears that blends the chorus of "Tiny Dancer" with verses from John's 1992 single "The One".

References

External links
 

1971 songs
1972 singles
2002 singles
Country ballads
Elton John songs
Ben Folds songs
Tim McGraw songs
Songs with music by Elton John
Songs with lyrics by Bernie Taupin
Song recordings produced by Byron Gallimore
Song recordings produced by Gus Dudgeon
DJM Records singles
Uni Records singles
Epic Records singles
Curb Records singles
Irish Singles Chart number-one singles
Songs about dancing
1970s ballads
Religious controversies in music
Christianity in popular culture controversies